Kurds in Finland refers to Kurds living in Finland. In 2021 there were 15,850 Kurdish speakers in Finland.

History
Kurds started first arriving to Finland in the 1970s and 1980s. In 1995 there were 1,166 Turkish citizens in Finland, out of which around 300-550 were Kurds. A significant portion of the Turkish pizzerias and kebab-restaurants in Finland are established by Kurds.

Some of the Finnish Kurds originate from Turkey and Iran, but most of them have come from Iraq, where they started arriving from in the 1990s as UNHCR quota refugees. Kurds make up the majority of Iraqi immigrants to Finland. After ISIL gained ground against the Peshmerga in Iraqi Kurdistan the Finnish Kurds organized protests against ISIL. According to the chairman of Finnish-Kurdish friendship association several dozens of Finnish Kurds had left to Syria and Iraq in order to fight against ISIL.

Culture
Finnish Kurds speak several different dialects of Kurdish, the largest of which are Sorani and Kurmanji Kurdish. Kurmanji has more speakers worldwide, but Sorani is the most spoken Kurdish dialect in Finland. It is likely that there are more ethnic Kurds than there are those who speak it as a first language. For example, some of the Kurds who originate from Turkey speak Turkish rather than Kurdish. There are several different Kurdish organizations in Finland, many of which have direct or indirect connections to political parties in Iraqi Kurdistan.

Almost all Finnish Kurds are Muslim and in the Iraqi Kurdistan, where the most Finnish Kurds hail from, most Kurds are Sunni Muslim. Different Kurdish organizations in Finland host their own Nowruz celebrations.

Organizations
There are several Kurdish organizations in Finland, including Kurdiliitto and Suomalais-Kurdilainen ystävyysseura.

Political activism
On August 26, 2022, Kurds living in Finland held a demonstration in Helsinki to protest the NATO agreement with Finland, Sweden and Turkey and the trilateral memorandum meeting of Finland, Sweden and Turkey. 
Turkey demanded that Finland end its support to the Kurdistan Workers' Party (PKK) and People's Defense Units (YPG).

Demographics

Distribution

See also  
 Kurds in Sweden

References

Kurds
Finland
 
Muslim communities in Europe
Kurdish people